Football is the number one sport in the Congo. The national team, known as Diables Rouges (meaning the Red Devils), has reached the finals of the African Cup of Nations on six occasions. They won the gold medal in Cameroon in 1972, and also reached the semi-finals two years later in Egypt. Several good players have come out of the Congo, many of whom have gone to France to play. In 1974, Paul Sayal Moukila won the Golden Ball for the African Player of the Year.

Congolese football stadiums

References